, or gyakujujijime, is a chokehold in judo. It is one of the twelve constriction techniques of Kodokan Judo in the Shime-waza list. Danzan Ryu includes this technique in the Shimete list under the name Namijujijime.  Ura-Juji-Jime is described in the Canon Of Judo and demonstrated in The Essence of Judo by Kyuzo Mifune.

The technique is called 'reverse' because the palms of the person applying the choke are facing the person who is being choked. The thumbs are on top, outside of the clothing and the fingers grab inside underneath the gi or clothing. The hands are high up each side of the neck. Scissoring the hands applies pressure to the carotid arteries reducing blood flow, rapidly resulting in loss of consciousness. In judo, this technique is always taught under strict supervision and is similarly closely observed by referees in competition.

Examples of contest this finished 
2018 World Judo Championships – Men's 90 kg Bronze medal match
Loss Eduard Trippel (GER) (1:55 Kata-Juji-Jime) Axel Clerget (FRA)Win 
Video (This movie can not be seen in Japan etc.)
Video Judo(IJF)channel

See also
The Canon Of Judo
Nami-Juji-Jime
Kata-Juji-Jime
Brazilian Jiu-Jitsu, Theory and Technique

References

External links
  Alabama Judo Federation is sanction and charter by United States Judo Association (USJA). Sensei Tirdad Daei. Judo: Shime Waza - Nami-Juji-Jime: Normal Cross Choke. Gyaku-Juji-Jime: Reverse Cross Choke. Kata-Juji-Jime: Half Cross Choke.
 https://www.youtube.com/watch?v=xX5WGdsVP90

Judo technique
Grappling
Grappling hold
Grappling positions
Martial art techniques